Mathrubhumi News is a Malayalam language free to air news channel owned by Mathrubhumi Printing And Publishing Co. Ltd. The news channel was launched on 23 January 2013, with the lighting of the traditional lamp by then MD late M. P. Veerendra Kumar and Managing Editor P. V. Chandran. The news channel underwent a brand revamp on April 21, 2021.

Key people 
 Rajeev Devaraj - Executive Editor

References

External links
 

Malayalam-language television channels
24-hour television news channels in India
Television channels and stations established in 2013
2013 establishments in Kerala